Said otaliq madrasah  is a two-storey madrasa building located in the center of the city of Denov, Surxondaryo Region. It was built by master architect Ahmad Mamat Buxoriy under the patronage of Amir Haydar's (representative of the Uzbek dynasty Mangitlar) father-in-law - Sayyid Ataliq - in the 19th century.

Madrasa was assumed that the madrasa was built in the 16th century during the reign of the Shaibanis in honor of the leader of the Islamic religion - Hazrat Xoja Alouddin Attor.
The style of construction is the same with the large madrasas of Bukhara (Kukeldash Madrasah and other madrasas). This type of madrasah is the unique in Surxondaryo Region. It is located on Mustaqillik Street in Denov. Currently, the madrasah is in a deplorable condition and is on the verge of collapse. It is included in the national list of real estate objects of material and cultural heritage of Uzbekistan.

History 

According to "Tuhfat az-Zairiyn", Hazrat Xoja Alouddin Attor Sheikh was the seventeenth in the chain of shaykhs of the Naqshbandi sect, and he was the successor and son-in-law of Baha' al-Din Naqshband. He was considered one of the two caliphs of that person. Hazrat Xoja Alouddin Attor came to Chaganiyan region with his family in 1389-1396 and died in Denov on March 18, 1400 AD. He was buried in a place called Sarmozor Ota. This place is now called "Shayx Attor Valiy" or "Ostona buva". Later generations of Xoja Alouddin Attor, including his son Sheikh Hasan Attoriy and grandson Xoja Yusuf Attor, are buried in the cemetery.

Researchers note that the Said otaliq madrasa was established by the descendants of Hazrat Xoja Alouddin Attor. According to Fathnomai Sultoniy, it was built by Sayyid otaliq, the father-in-law of Haydar, the ruler of Bukhara Emirate, at the beginning of the 19th century. Sayyid otaliq served as governor of Denov for several years.

Before the Bukharan revolution, about 400 students studied at the madrasa, and 33 teachers taught them. The madrasah was closed during the USSR. In 1956-1960 and 1972-1973, it was scientifically studied by scientists of the Uzbekistan SSR. Since 1991, with the initiative of Hoji Luqmonxon Haydarxon oʻgʻli, 4-year education of students has been started in the madrasah. Today, the activity of the madrasa as a secondary Islamic educational institution has been suspended. According to reports in 2018-2019, the madrasa building was on the verge of collapse. The madrasa was included in the national list of "Real Estate Objects of Tangible Cultural Heritage" approved in 2019, and a craft center is planned to be built there. In 2020, measures were developed to preserve the building and improve its infrastructure, and the deadline was March–April 2021.

Architecture 
The architectural style of the madrasah was established in accordance with the traditions of its time. The courtyard of the building consists of large and small rooms built on two floors. There is a main room behind the facade, and a mosque and a classroom on both sides of it. The corners of the madrasa were decorated with bouquets. The number of terraces in the yard of 40x29.5 meters is 2. The depth of the foundation of the madrasa is 5.5 meters. The roof is vaulted. The windows of the room are made of ganch bars.

References 

Islamic buildings